District 1 of the Georgia Senate is a senatorial district that encompasses parts of Southeast Georgia encompassing most of Savannah's southern suburbs, as well as a sliver of Savannah itself.  The current senator is Ben Watson.

District officeholders

References

Government of Georgia (U.S. state)
Georgia Senate districts